The littletooth sandeater (Lethrinops microstoma) is a species of cichlid endemic to Lake Malawi where it is known from sandy areas around Cape Maclear and in Senga Bay.  This species grows to a length of  TL.  It can also be found in the aquarium trade.

References

littletooth sandeater
Taxa named by Ethelwynn Trewavas
littletooth sandeater
Taxonomy articles created by Polbot